The Exposition of 1930 was an international exposition that took place in Liège, Belgium between May 3 and November 3, 1930. The fair marked the centenary of the establishment of the Belgian kingdom in 1830. The Liège exposition was one of two simultaneous fairs: one at Liège focused on industry and science from 1830 to 1930 and one at Antwerp concerned with colonial and maritime themes.

The two expositions are the more specialized type of world's fairs which Belgium hosted in addition to its hosting of 6 larger expositions. The official name for the Liège exposition was Exposition internationale de la grande industrie, sciences et applications, art wallon ancien (International Exposition of Large Industry, Sciences and Applications, Art of Old Wallonia"). The exposition also served as an incentive to complete flood control work around Liège that had been delayed by the First World War. The Pont-barrage de Monsin was built at this time.

In addition to exhibits on science and technology, the exposition included a retrospective on Walloon art  and an amusement park. The exposition took place at two locations. The Parc de Boverie, which had hosted the 1905 exposition was renovated. A military maneuver ground north of town became the residential area of Droixhe.

The exhibition was not considered a great success. Attracting six million visitors, the organizers had anticipated ten to twelve million. Attendance was cut by the economy, bad weather and public indifference. The exhibition resulted in a modest fiscal loss for the organizers and the city. Vestiges of the exposition included a new airport and train station, control of the Meuse, the commencement of the Albert Canal and the Pont de Coronmeuse, as well as reconstruction of places damaged during the war.

Gallery

Bibliography
 Archives of the city of Liège, spécial exposition de Liège 1930, 577 boîtes et classeurs.
 De Sutter, Anne-Sophie, Les expositions internationales de Liège et d’Anvers en 1930, mémoire de licence, faculté de philosophie et lettres, Université Catholique de Louvain, 1994.
 Kula, Sébastien, L'Exposition Internationale de Liège 1930, mémoire de licence, faculté de philosophie et lettres, Université de Liège, 2006.

External links
 Postcards of the Exposition internationale de 1930

Culture in Liège
1930 in Belgium
World's fairs in Liège
History of Liège